This page summarizes projects that brought more than  of new liquid fuel capacity to market with the first production of fuel beginning in 2006.  This is part of the Wikipedia summary of Oil Megaprojects.  2006 saw 30 projects come on stream with an aggregate capacity of  when full production was reached this list does not like include any of the enormous project developed in the United States which dwarf these by +-5000 BOE (which may not have been in 2006).

Quick links to other years

Detailed project table for 2006 

Terminology 
 Year startup: year of first oil. Specific date if available.
 Operator: company undertaking the project.
 Area: onshore (LAND), offshore (OFF), offshore deep water (ODW), tar sands (TAR).
 Type: liquid category (i.e. Natural Gas Liquids, Natural gas condensate, Crude oil)
 Grade: oil quality (light, medium, heavy, sour) or API gravity
 2P resvs: 2P (proven + probable) oil reserves in giga barrels (Gb).
 GOR: The ratio of produced gas to produced oil, commonly abbreviated GOR.
 Peak year: year of the production plateau/peak.
 Peak: maximum production expected (thousand barrels/day).
 Discovery: year of discovery.
 Capital investment: expected capital cost; FID (Final Investment Decision) - If no FID, then normally no project development contracts can be awarded.  For many projects, a FEED stage (Front End Engineering Design) precedes the FID.
 Notes: comments about the project (footnotes).
 Ref.: list of sources.

Terminology 
 Year startup: year of first oil. Specific date if available.
 Operator: company undertaking the project.
 Area: onshore (LAND), offshore (OFF), offshore deep water (ODW), tar sands (TAR).
 Type: liquid category (i.e. Natural Gas Liquids, Natural gas condensate, Crude oil)
 Grade: oil quality (light, medium, heavy, sour) or API gravity
 2P resvs: 2P (proven + probable) oil reserves in giga barrels (Gb).
 GOR: The ratio of produced gas to produced oil, commonly abbreviated GOR.
 Peak year: year of the production plateau/peak.
 Peak: maximum production expected (thousand barrels/day).
 Discovery: year of discovery.
 Capital investment: expected capital cost; FID (Final Investment Decision) - If no FID, then normally no project development contracts can be awarded.  For many projects, a FEED stage (Front End Engineering Design) precedes the FID.
 Notes: comments about the project (footnotes).
 Ref.: list of sources.

References

Oil fields
Oil megaprojects
2006 in technology